James Harkness  (1864–1923) was a Canadian mathematician, born in Derby, England, and educated at Trinity College, Cambridge with a B.A. in 1885 and an M.A. in 1889.  Coming early to the United States, he was connected with Bryn Mawr College from 1888 to 1903, for the last seven years as professor of mathematics.
  
Harkness complemented Scott with a course on "Abelian Integrals and Functions" that also drew on the latest literature in German — the work of Alfred Clebsch and Paul Gordan, Bernhard Riemann, Hermann Amandus Schwarz and others — and "aimed to prepare the students for the recent Memoirs of Felix Klein in the Mathematische Annalen".

In 1903, he was appointed Peter Redpath professor of pure mathematics at McGill University, Montreal, Quebec.

Harkness was for a time a vice president of the American Mathematical Society and associate editor of its Transactions, was elected a member of the London Mathematical Society and in 1908 became a fellow of the Royal Society of Canada.  He published, with Professor Frank Morley, two treatises on the Theory of Functions and collaborated on the article "Elliptic Functions", in the German Encyclopædia of Mathematics (1914–15).

References

External links
 Frank Morley and James Harkness A treatise on the theory of functions  (New York: Macmillan, 1893)
 Frank Morley and James Harkness Introduction To The Theory of Analytic Functions (G.E.Stechert And Company, 1898)

Canadian mathematicians
Canadian science writers
Fellows of the Royal Society of Canada
Alumni of Trinity College, Cambridge
Bryn Mawr College faculty
Academic staff of McGill University
People from Derby
1864 births
1923 deaths